Bernard W. Close (1889–1972) was an architect in Jacksonville, Florida. He designed many residences in the Riverside and Avondale neighborhoods.

Close graduated from Cornell University and worked in New York before coming to Jacksonville in 1925 during the Florida Land Boom. He worked for Roy A. Benjamin before establishing his own practice and was president of the Florida Association of Architects from 1930 to 1931.

Works
Leo Hughes Residence at 1854 Montgomery Place
Richard Forester Residence at 1886 Montgomery Place
Willow Branch Library at 2875 Park Street
4321 Kelnepa Drive in South Jacksonville
4346 Kelnepa Drive in South Jacksonville
4424 Kelnepa Drive in South Jacksonville
San Marco Branch Library
1961 River Boulevard in San Marco
2400 Seminole Road in Atlantic Beach

References

1889 births
1972 deaths
Cornell University College of Architecture, Art, and Planning alumni
20th-century American architects